In Greek mythology, Eurybius or Eurybios (Ancient Greek: Εὐρύβιος) was the name of the following personages:
 Eurybius, one of the commanders of horned Lamian Centaurs or Lamian Pheres, offspring of the Lamusides nymphs. He joined Dionysus in his Indian campaign against.
Eurybius, a Pylian prince as son of King Neleus and Chloris, daughter of the Minyan king Amphion of Orchomenus. His siblings were Pero, Periclymenus, Alastor, Chomius, Asterius, Deimachus, Epilaus, Eurymenes, Evagoras, Phrasius, Pylaon, Taurus and Nestor. Eurybius along with his brothers, except Nestor, were killed by Heracles.
 Eurybius, a prince of Tiryns as son of King Eurystheus and Antimache, daughter of Amphidamas of Arcadia. He was the brother of Admete, Alexander, Iphimedon, Mentor and Perimedes. Eurybius was killed in battle by the Athenians along with his brothers in the war that ensued when Athens refused to deliver the Heracleidae up to Eurystheus. Alternately, Eurybius, Perimedes and his another brother, Eurypylus, were all slain by Heracles when at a sacrificial meal in honor of his Twelve Labors being completed they served him a smaller portion of meat than they did for themselves.

Notes

References 

 Apollodorus, The Library with an English Translation by Sir James George Frazer, F.B.A., F.R.S. in 2 Volumes, Cambridge, MA, Harvard University Press; London, William Heinemann Ltd. 1921. ISBN 0-674-99135-4. Online version at the Perseus Digital Library. Greek text available from the same website.
 Athenaeus of Naucratis, The Deipnosophists or Banquet of the Learned. London. Henry G. Bohn, York Street, Covent Garden. 1854. Online version at the Perseus Digital Library.
 Athenaeus of Naucratis, Deipnosophistae. Kaibel. In Aedibus B.G. Teubneri. Lipsiae. 1887. Greek text available at the Perseus Digital Library.
 Nonnus of Panopolis, Dionysiaca translated by William Henry Denham Rouse (1863-1950), from the Loeb Classical Library, Cambridge, MA, Harvard University Press, 1940.  Online version at the Topos Text Project.
 Nonnus of Panopolis, Dionysiaca. 3 Vols. W.H.D. Rouse. Cambridge, MA., Harvard University Press; London, William Heinemann, Ltd. 1940-1942. Greek text available at the Perseus Digital Library.
 Pausanias, Description of Greece with an English Translation by W.H.S. Jones, Litt.D., and H.A. Ormerod, M.A., in 4 Volumes. Cambridge, MA, Harvard University Press; London, William Heinemann Ltd. 1918. . Online version at the Perseus Digital Library
 Pausanias, Graeciae Descriptio. 3 vols. Leipzig, Teubner. 1903.  Greek text available at the Perseus Digital Library.

Centaurs
Neleides
Princes in Greek mythology
Kings in Greek mythology
Pylian characters in Greek mythology